The Football Governance Inquiry was a British public inquiry into the governance of football in the United Kingdom. The inquiry was announced on 7 December 2010.

John Whittingdale, the Committee Chair said: "The Government has said that it will encourage the reform of football governance rules to support the co-operative ownership of football clubs by supporters, and there is widespread concern that the current governance arrangements are not fit-for-purpose."

Committee members

The committee of inquiry, the members comprises:

Background

After several high-profile controversial events in football including but not limited to Thaksin Shinawatra's ownership of Manchester City F.C., leveraged buyouts by Tom Hicks and George Gillett at Liverpool F.C. and Malcolm Glazer at Manchester United, Portsmouth F.C.'s administration and four successive ownerships within the space of 12 months, public in-fighting within The Football Association, England's unsuccessful multi-million pound bid for the 2018 FIFA World Cup, record high amount of money being paid to sports agents and record numbers of clubs entering administration, there was scope to see what could be done to improve Governance of football in United Kingdom.

Criticism

BBC's sports editor David Bond criticised the scope of the inquiry as being "too broad to deliver anything worthwhile".

The inquiry

Members of the public were asked to submit written evidence for the inquiry, the following questions were asked:

 Should football clubs in the UK be treated differently from other commercial organisations?
 Are football governance rules in England and Wales, and the governing bodies which set and apply them, fit for purpose?
 Is there too much debt in the professional game?
 What are the pros and cons of the Supporter Trust share-holding model?
 Is Government intervention justified and, if so, what form should it take?
 Are there lessons to be learned from football governance models across the UK and abroad, and from governance models in other sports?

The Government published a 447-page document containing written information from members of the public, football supporters' trusts, universities and football clubs notably Chester F.C. and Scarborough Athletic F.C.

On 8 February 2011, the Committee held the first evidence session for its inquiry into football governance took place at Portcullis House.

Witnesses

References

External links
Football Governance Inquiry at www.parliament.uk

Public inquiries in the United Kingdom
2011 in British politics
Football in England
Governance in the United Kingdom